Port Shelter, known in Cantonese as Ngau Mei Hoi, is a harbour south of Sai Kung Peninsula in Hong Kong. The water body connects to Inner Port Shelter (known in Cantonese as Sai Kung Hoi), as well as Hebe Haven, Rocky Harbour and other water body. Outer Port Shelter, is situated at the mouth of the harbour.

Geography
The boundary of Port Shelter has different definition according to different sources. Publication of the U.S. Hydrographic Office, had stated the western shores of Keui Island (now known as Kau Sai Chau) and Jin Island, as well as eastern and north-east shores of the mainland area (now HKUST, Tseung Kwan O New Town and Clear Water Bay Peninsula), were the boundaries of Port Shelter.
 
Inner Port Shelter is located near the head of Port Shelter, while Hebe Haven was classified as an inlet in the western shore of Port Shelter. The entrance of Inner Port Shelter lies between Yingam Tow  and a line of rocks that extended from Kiau To , an islet (now spells as Kiu Tau). The islet itself is connected to Sharp Island (Kiu Tsui Chau) by a bank. The bank, or known as a sand levee or a tombolo, is part of the Hong Kong UNESCO Global Geopark.

While The Hydrographic Office's 1943 publication did not have the definition of Outer Port Shelter, H.K.'s Agriculture, Fisheries and Conservation Department had deployed artificial reef to the Outer Port Shelter in the 2000s. They defined the area by coordinates instead. Roughly, it is a triangular area between Steep Island, Basalt Island and the southern shore of Jin Island (known as Tiu Chung Chau in the publication).

Environmental Protection Department, partnered with local universities, also conducted water quality and phytoplankton research in the Port Shelter. In their research, they used a border definition of the area, which their Port Shelter includes Port Shelter proper, Inner and Outer Port Shelter as well as Hebe Haven, and is a bay that "bordered on its northernside by the Sai Kung Peninsula and on its west and southwestern sides by the Clear Water Bay Peninsula". They also found out that, some data point of their research, are obviously influenced by surface runoff and pollution loading from the surrounding catchment area.

Islands

These islands are considered within the boundary of the water body of the Port Shelter proper: The three largest islands were Kau Sai Chau, Jin Island and Sharp Island respectively.

 Kau Sai Chau
 Jin Island (Tiu Chung Chau)
 Sharp Island (Kiu Tsui Chau)
 Shelter Island (Ngau Mei Chau)
 Yim Tin Tsai
 Kwun Cham Wan
 Tuen Tau Chau
 Yau Lung Kok
 Table Island (Ping Min Chau)
 Mong Chau Tsai
 Shek Chau

Note: the book Southern District Officer Reports: Islands and Villages in Rural Hong Kong, 1910–60 also listed High Island, Town Island and Ninepin Group in their chapter "The Islands of Port Shelter". But the first two are located in Rocky Harbour, and the last one is outside the mouth of Outer Port Shelter.

Within Inner Port Shelter
These islands are considered within the boundary of the water body of Inner Port Shelter:

 Yeung Chau
 Pak Sha Chau
 Cham Tau Chau
 Kiu Tau
 Tai Tsan Chau
 Tai Chau
 Lap Sap Chau
 Siu Tsan Chau

Freshwater discharge
The greater Port Shelter area receives discharge from Ho Chung River, Tai Chung Hau Stream, and Sha Kok Mei Stream, as well as man-made storm outfalls and a submarine outfall from the Sai Kung Sewage Treatment Works.

Physical properties
According to measurements by a research, the average salinity of their three sampling stations was 32.7. All stations are located inside Port Shelter. The measurements, conducted from 4 October 2012 to 15 April 2013, also found that the average water temperature was 19.1 °C (with a range from 15.8 °C to 27.8 °C), as well as pH (acidity) of 8.08, with range from 7.62 to 8.35. They also recorded the vertical profile for some of their measurements.

Another research, recorded and estimated the tidal flushing time of the greater Port Shelter area which their tidal stations were deployed in the Port Shelter proper, as well as in Rocky Harbour, Hebe Haven, Inner Port Shelter and Outer Port Shelter. Such as a station at Leung Shuen Wan (or known as High Island) and in Po Toi O. They concluded that in the inner Port Shelter, the flushing time is the longest among the fish culture zones of Hong Kong, which is 40 days in the dry season. While Po Toi O is located at the mouth of Port Shelter, its hydrodynamics is mainly affected by the open ocean, thus the flushing time was just 5.3 days in dry season in the computer estimation.

Biodiversity
A research conducted in 2006, had recorded a total of 106 fish species in Port Shelter in their preliminary report, including rare species Cephalopholis urodeta, Bodianus axillaris and Echidna nebulosa.

History

In a 1863 book, stated Port Shelter and Rocky Harbour are the two main components of a deep bay. At that time the water body was still part of the Qing Empire, under the Xin'an County.

Port Shelter was also mentioned in a report to the UK government in 1898 by James Stewart Lockhart, shortly after the signing of the Convention for the Extension of Hong Kong Territory. It stated the harbour is a deep water port that suitable for ships in any size. The Convention ceded Port Shelter and other areas that collectively known as the New Territories and New Kowloon, to the British Empire, as an extension of the colony of Hong Kong.

In the past, villagers from the six villages of Pak Tam Chung, would collect coral from Port Shelter to make lime. Nowadays, fishermen still catch Sea urchin in the Port Shelter.

Related administrative areas

Former Port Shelter Firing Range
In 1950, (some source said 1936) the harbour and some islands were part of the Port Shelter Firing Range, an outdoor firing range for the British military that stationing on the colony. Most of the range ceased to be used in the 1970s. The government also relocated the residents of Kau Sai Chau, an island in the firing range to the land area of Hebe Haven (known as Pak Sha Wan in the publication) in the 1950. The permanent housing was completed in 1954.

In 2011, Shelter Island, which was formerly part of the firing range, had discovered a mortar shell.

Port Shelter Water Control Zone
Despite there is no legal definition of the boundary of the water body, a related concept Port Shelter Water Control Zone had a legally defined boundary. It was regulated by the Water Pollution Control Ordinance (Chapter 358 of the Law of Hong Kong) as well as "Water Pollution Control (Port Shelter Water Control Zone) Order" (Chapter 358M) and other regulations. The water control zone covers not only the Port Shelter and Inner Port Shelter proper, but also Hebe Haven, Sham Tuk Mun, Tsam Chuk Wan, Rocky Harbour and many other surrounding water body.

In 2018, Typhoon Mangkhut damaged the Sai Kung Sewage Treatment Works, which just bordering the water control zone. After emergency repairs, the government did not find the water quality of the water control zone had become worse.

Outer Port Shelter Marine Park (proposed)
Another related and overlapping concept, the proposed Outer Port Shelter Marine Park, was scrapped in 2014.

In 2018, World Wide Fund for Nature proposed to establish Port Shelter Marine Protected Area. They proposed to turn at least 30% area of Port Shelter to be a no-take zone.

Port Shelter, Inner Port Shelter, along with Rocky Harbours were also included in a proposed fisheries protection area in the 2000s, while Outer Port Shelter was listed as a no-take zone.

As Specified Sheltered Waters
In the Schedule 2 of the Merchant Shipping (Certification and Licensing) Regulation (Chapter 548D of H.K. Law), they defined Port Shelter, in Specified Sheltered Waters context. For the purpose of that regulation, they defined Port Shelter Area as:

The specified sheltered water that defined from above coordinates and natural boundaries, actually covers the Inner Port Shelter and Hebe Haven but only part of Port Shelter, that defined by the publication of the U.S. Hydrographic Office, which draw the southern boundaries from Lung Ha Wan to a peaked rock south of Jin Island.

That regulation also defined "Port Shelter and Rocky Harbour Area" that cover all of the Port Shelter (and some part of Outer Port Shelter by some definitions) and Rocky Harbour:

References

Ports and harbours of Hong Kong
Sai Kung District